Yolanda Soler (born January 9, 1972) is a Spanish judoka, Olympic champion. She won a bronze medal in the lightweight (48 kg) division at the 1996 Summer Olympics in Atlanta.

References

External links
 

1972 births
Living people
Olympic medalists in judo
Spanish female judoka
Judoka at the 1992 Summer Olympics
Judoka at the 1996 Summer Olympics
Medalists at the 1996 Summer Olympics
Olympic bronze medalists for Spain
Mediterranean Games bronze medalists for Spain
Mediterranean Games medalists in judo
Competitors at the 1997 Mediterranean Games
20th-century Spanish women